Destanee Gabriella Aiava (born 10 May 2000) is an Australian professional tennis player.

She has career-high WTA rankings of 147 in singles, achieved on 11 September 2017, and of 192 in doubles, achieved October 2019. Aiava has won five singles and five doubles titles on the ITF Women's Circuit.

She made her Grand Slam main-draw debut after winning the 2016 U18 Australian Championships, granting her a wildcard into the 2017 Australian Open. She thus became the first player, male or female, born in 2000 or later to participate in the main draw of a Grand Slam tournament.

Early life
Aiava is Samoan descent; her father, Mark, was born in New Zealand to Samoan parents, and her mother, Rosie, was born in American Samoa.

Junior career

2012–2016
In 2012, at the age of 12, Aiava represented Australia at Roland Garros in the Longines Future Tennis Aces Tournament. Competing against fifteen of the top under-13 female tennis players, Aiava won the tournament and won the right to play alongside Steffi Graf in an exhibition match. The years following, Aiava mainly played on the junior circuit. In 2014, she won the Tecnifibre Tennis Central Championships and NZ ITF Summer Championships in New Zealand as well as Australian International's in Queensland and Victoria. At the age of 14, she won the U18 Canadian world ranking event in Montreal, Quebec.

Professional career

2015–2016
In early 2015, Aiava made her professional debut at the Burnie International after receiving wildcards in the singles and doubles, where she lost early in both. At the Launceston Tennis International, Aiava won her first professional main-draw match against Lu Jiajing. She also made the quarterfinals of a 15K tournament in Melbourne in April 2015. In March 2016, Aiava made her first career final at a $25k tournament in Canberra. In December 2016, she won the U18 Girls' Australian Championships and earned a wildcard into the 2017 Australian Open. She thus became the first player born in the 21st century to play at a Grand Slam championship.

2017: First ITF titles and Grand Slam debut
Aiava commenced the year by qualifying for the Brisbane International to make her maiden WTA main-draw appearance. Aiava defeated Bethanie Mattek-Sands in the first round, before losing to two-time Grand Slam champion and world No. 9, Svetlana Kuznetsova. Aiava made her Grand Slam debut at the Australian Open as a wildcard, losing in round one to Mona Barthel.

In February, Aiava won the first ITF title of her career, winning the $25k event in Perth by defeating Viktória Kužmová in the final. The following month, she won another $25k title, this time in Mornington, beating Barbora Krejčíková in the final. In April, Aiava was named in the Australia Fed Cup team for the first time. In May, she reached the semifinals of the Open Saint-Gaudens, before losing the first round of qualifying at the French Open. In June, Aiava lost in the final round of Wimbledon qualifying. In September, she reached the second round of qualifying for the US Open before granting a wildcard into Tournoi de Québec, where she lost in the first round. In October, Aiava reached the final of the Canberra International. 
In December, she was unable to defend her girls' title, losing to Jaimee Fourlis in a reversal of the result from 2016. The following week, Aiava won the Australian Open Wildcard Playoff.

2018: Third ITF title
Aiava was awarded a wildcard to Brisbane International where she lost in the first round to another wildcard entry, Ajla Tomljanović.

Aiava received another wildcard for the Australian Open, where she was defeated in the first round by world No. 1 and top seed, Simona Halep. Aiava had two set points in the first set before going off-court to receive a medical time out. She subsequently lost the match in straight sets. Aiava reached the quarterfinal of the Burnie International and Zhuhai Open, before reaching the final of the Clay Court International. In April, Aiava won the title at the Osaka event; her third ITF and first title outside Australia.

In May, Aiava lost in the first round of French Open qualifying.

2019
Aiava began season at the Brisbane International. She qualified for the main draw with victories over Vania King, Mandy Minella and Christina McHale. She then defeated Kristina Mladenovic in the first round, before falling to second seed Naomi Osaka.
Aiava received her third Australian Open wildcard entry, losing to 17th seed Madison Keys.
She then won the Clay Court International title on March 24 by defeating world No. 289, Risa Ozaki.

2022
In January, Aiava lost in the first round of the Australian Open qualifying.

Grand Slam performance timelines

Singles

Doubles

ITF Circuit finals

Singles: 15 (5 titles, 10 runner-ups)

Doubles: 11 (6 titles, 5 runner-ups)

Top 10 wins

References

Further reading
 Herald Sun
 The Sydney Morning Herald
 The Sydney Morning Herald
 Herald Sun
 Courier Mail
  UBI Tennis

External links

 
 
 

2000 births
Living people
Australian female tennis players
Tennis players from Melbourne
Australian people of New Zealand descent
Australian sportspeople of Samoan descent
Australian people of American Samoan descent
21st-century Australian women
People from Narre Warren
Sportswomen from Victoria (Australia)